Leela Ram (born 20 April 1961) is an Indian politician and a member of the 14th Haryana Legislative Assembly elected from the Kaithal constituency in the 2019 Haryana Legislative Assembly election. He had also served as Member of Legislative Assembly in 10th Haryana Legislative Assembly from Kaithal.

Personal life
Ram was born on 20 April 1961 to Jhandu Ram in Ujjana village of Kultaran tehsil in Kaithal district of Haryana. He is a post graduate and completed his Master of Arts in political science from Kurukshetra University in 1985. Ram is married to Balbir Kaur, with whom he has a daughter.

Political career
Ram had served as Member of Legislative Assembly in Haryana Legislative Assembly from Kaithal seat as an Indian National Lok Dal candidate from 2000 to 2005. He then joined Bharatiya Janta Party in 2014.

In the 2019 Haryana Legislative Assembly election, he won from Kaithal seat as a BJP candidate, defeating two-time winner Randeep Singh Surjewala of Indian National Congress by 530 votes and got re-elected.

References

1961 births
Living people
Haryana MLAs 2019–2024
Bharatiya Janata Party politicians from Haryana
People from Kaithal district